Lough Funshinagh is a lake and Special Area of Conservation in County Roscommon, Ireland, found to the west of Lough Ree. It has been called Ireland's amazing disappearing lake, due to the way it empties quickly - in as little as two days - and unpredictably, sometimes killing thousands of fish.  Lough Funshinagh is one of a number of seasonal lakes, or turlough, found in the  karst areas of Ireland, west of the River Shannon.

2016 flood event 
Prior to 2016 the lake drained through a swallow hole, now blocked, which caused the lake to double its surface area. In March 2022 plans to drain the lake by constructing a 2.5-mile (4km) pipeline to the River Shannon were halted when the Friends of the Irish Environment obtained an injunction, halting the work on the grounds that no environmental impact assessment had been carried out. Houses near to the lake are now protected by sandbags. Since the 2016 flood there has been a decline in the number Bewick’s swans, whooper swans and curlews found in the area surrounding the lake.

See also 
 List of loughs in Ireland

References 

Lakes of County Roscommon